Richard Wolffenstein (21 August 1864 – 5 June 1926) was a German chemist.

He discovered acetone peroxide in 1895 by reacting acetone with hydrogen peroxide.

The Wolffenstein-Böters reaction, which he discovered in 1913, was an alternative production method for explosives.

Biography
Wolffenstein studied in Leipzig, Heidelberg, Munich and Berlin. He was awarded his doctor title in 1888, and became an assistant at the veterinary hochschule in Berlin, and later in Breslau under Albert Ladenburg. In 1893, he returned to the Technical Hochschule, now called the Technical University of Berlin, where he gained his habilitation in 1895 and became professor of chemistry in 1921.

References

1864 births
1926 deaths
19th-century German chemists
Scientists from Berlin
Academic staff of the Technical University of Berlin
Academic staff of the University of Breslau
20th-century German chemists